"Forget Me" is a song by Scottish singer-songwriter Lewis Capaldi. It was released on 9 September 2022 through Vertigo and Universal and serves as the lead single of his upcoming second studio album, Broken by Desire to Be Heavenly Sent. "Forget Me" debuted at number-one in the UK Singles Chart, giving Capaldi his third number-one single in the United Kingdom. It was nominated for Song of the Year at the 2023 Brit Awards.

Background and composition
The song marks the singer's first release in nearly three years. The song release was accompanied by an open letter, in which Capaldi admits to being nervous about the release, saying, "it could be the beginning of a beautiful chapter in my life, or the very public downward spiral that, let's face it, I'm probably due". According to Capaldi, the song deals with a break-up he experienced the year prior and the "post-life" of his ex he was only able to witness through social media.

The song was described as an "80s-synth inspired track" as well as a "change of pace" in sound for the singer. The 1975's "Somebody Else" inspired the production of the track.

Music video
The music video was released on 9 September 2022 and was directed by Louis Bhose, who had previously directed the music video for "Grace". It was filmed at Pikes Hotel in Ibiza. The video pays homage to Wham!'s "Club Tropicana".  About the video, Bhose explained, "You hear a sad song and you expect a sad video. There's catharsis in that. But to go in the other direction completely felt more in line with the Lewis that walked onstage at Glastonbury in full Noel Gallagher getup".

Charts

Weekly charts

Year-end charts

Certifications

Release history

References

2022 singles
2022 songs
Lewis Capaldi songs
Songs written by Ben Kohn
Songs written by Lewis Capaldi
Songs written by Michael Pollack (musician)
Songs written by Peter Kelleher (songwriter)
Song recordings produced by TMS (production team)
UK Singles Chart number-one singles